has been the governor of Shizuoka Prefecture since 2009 and is currently serving his fourth term. He completed his D.Phil. at Wolfson College, Oxford, under Professor Peter Mathias and was Professor of Economics History at Waseda University, Tokyo. He was also Professor of Economics History and Vice Director of the International Research Centre for Japanese Studies in Kyoto and President at Shizuoka University of Arts and culture. He is co-editor of many studies including Intra-Asian Trade and Industrialization and The Evolving Structure of the East Asian Economic System since 1700, both published by Routledge.

He is opposed to the plan of Tokyo-Nagoya MagLev route in terms of ecological system and water supply.

Career
A former economic historian, Kawakatsu was a professor at the International Research Center for Japanese Studies in Kyoto from 1998 to 2007. Kawakatsu's research on "civilization theory" has been critiqued by historians such as Tessa Morris-Suzuki. Kawakatsu has written numerous books in the Nihonjinron genre of Japanese cultural studies.

References

1948 births
Living people
Politicians from Shizuoka Prefecture
Waseda University alumni
Alumni of the University of Oxford
Academic staff of Waseda University
Governors of Shizuoka Prefecture